Rodrigo Sorogoyen del Amo (born 16 September 1981) is a Spanish film director and screenwriter. He won the Goya Award for Best Director and the Goya Award for Best Original Screenplay for The Realm, a feat he repeated for The Beasts. He was previously nominated for the Goya Award for Best New Director for Stockholm, and the Goya Award for Best Director and the Goya Award for Best Original Screenplay for May God Save Us. For the short film Mother, Sorogoyen won the Goya Award for Best Fictional Short Film and was nominated for the Academy Award for Best Live Action Short Film. He often works in tandem with Isabel Peña.

Biography 
Born on 16 September 1981 in Madrid, Rodrigo Sorogoyen is the grandson of filmmaker Antonio del Amo. Sorogoyen is known among his closest circles as Ruy. His interest in filmmaking picked up upon the experience of watching Léon: The Professional, which fascinated him. Graduated in history from the Complutense University of Madrid, he entered the ECAM in 2004.

Filmography

Television

References

External links 
 

1981 births
Living people
Best Director Goya Award winners
Spanish screenwriters
Film directors from the Community of Madrid
21st-century Spanish screenwriters